Soft Bomb is an album by New Zealand group The Chills, released in 1992. It was the follow-up to Submarine Bells, which had hit number 1 in New Zealand in 1990.

Released to good reviews, Soft Bomb was followed by a world tour with an enlarged Chills line-up. In the midst of their US tour, financial backing and promotion was withdrawn for the album and tour. This line-up of the band disintegrated and Martin Phillipps would take some time to rebuild the band. Phillipps parted company with Slash Records after this album and tour.

Production
Van Dyke Parks worked on the album, scoring "Water Wolves."

Critical reception
The New York Times wrote: "Strange and majestic, these songs are Mr. Phillipps's attempt to test and reshape the possibilities of pop." The Washington Post called it "a shimmering, buoyant pleasure."

Track listing
All songs written by Martin Phillipps.
"The Male Monster from the Id"
"Background Affair"
"Ocean Ocean"
"Soft Bomb"
"there is no harm in trying"
"Strange Case"
"Soft Bomb II"
"So Long"
"Song for Randy Newman etc."
"Sleeping Giants"
"Double Summer"
"Sanctuary"
"Halo Fading"
"there is no point in trying" 
"Entertainer"
"Water Wolves"
"Soft Bomb III"

References

1992 albums
The Chills albums
Slash Records albums